Ecological Building is both a design process and the structure that is a result of such a design process. 

The ecological building design process is a modern architecture variant of permaculture design. 

An ecological building is a structure that is designed to create and sustain mutually beneficial relationships with all of the elements of its local ecology.  A building's local ecology, or environment, is made up of particular physical and biological elements and their interactions.

The abiotic, or physical elements are defined by the local geology and the local climate.  The local geology is defined by the soil type, substrata, local land use, and water patterns of the site and its surroundings.  The local climate is made up of the weather patterns, wind patterns, solar patterns, and pollution patterns for the site and its surroundings.

The biotic or living elements are all of the local species and local ecosystems - including humans and urban ecologies - that interact with the site.

This concept is distinctly different from green building, or sustainable architecture where the goal is to "minimize the negative environmental impact of buildings". Ecological building is a positive design goal that sets out to increase beneficial interactions, whereas green building is a negative design outlook that seeks only the reduction of negative interactions. Inherent in green building is the assumption that any human interaction with a site is unavoidably negative, and that mitigating these negative impacts is the best that is possible. With ecological building, the designer acknowledges that humans can play an integral, beneficial role in improving and sustaining the health and vitality of their local ecology.

See also
Ecological design
 Regenerative Design
 First EcoHouse
 Stadthaus
sustainable architecture

External links
BuildingEcology.com

Design